Live at the Berlin Jazz Days 1980 is a live album featuring a memorial concert for Lennie Tristano by saxophonist Lee Konitz and pianist Martial Solal which was recorded at the Berliner Philharmonie by Sender Freies Berlin as part of the Berliner Jazztage in 1980 and released on the MPS label in 1982. The album was also released in the US on Pausa Records.

Critical reception

The Allmusic review stated "Although the repertoire certainly pays tribute to Tristano's legacy the altoist had grown quite a bit as an improviser during the previous 30 years and Solal is a major stylist in his own right. Their explorative and spontaneous music covers a wide area of styles from swing and cool-toned bop to freer explorations and lives up to one's expectations".

Track listing 
All Compositions by Martial Solal and Lee Konitz unless noted.
 "Invitation" (Bronisław Kaper, Paul Francis Webster) – 5:45
 "No. 317 East 32nd Street" (Lennie Tristano) – 4:37
 "A Ballad for Lennie" – 7:35
 "Improvisation No. 53" – 5:56
 "Just a Blues" – 5:40
 "Star Eyes" (Gene de Paul, Don Raye) – 5:32
 "Noblesse Oblige" (Ray Noble) – 5:44
 "Subconciously" (sic) (Lee Konitz) – 4:50

Personnel 
Lee Konitz – alto saxophone
Martial Solal – piano

References 

Lee Konitz live albums
Martial Solal live albums
MPS Records live albums
1982 live albums